The Man Who Finally Died  is a 1963 British CinemaScope thriller film directed by Quentin Lawrence and starring Stanley Baker, Peter Cushing, Mai Zetterling and Eric Portman. It was based on a 1959 ITV series of the same name. The screenplay concerns a German immigrant living in Britain who receives a mysterious phone call telling him his father is not really dead. He returns to Bavaria to investigate the matter. John Burke wrote a novelisation of the screenplay.

Plot summary
Joe Newman, formerly Joachim Deutsch, returns to his small hometown in Bavaria, after living in the UK since the outbreak of World War II. He seeks information of what has become of his father, Kurtz. He finds out that his father is dead, but that he escaped from behind the Iron Curtain, went to live with a certain Dr von Brecht, and later married a woman named Lisa. Everyone Joe approaches to find answers, including Police Inspector Hofmeister and insurance agent Brenner, is reluctant to talk and give more details concerning the circumstances of his father. Joe begins to suspect that this is a cover-up and that they all want to keep certain facts regarding his father a secret. He breaks into von Brecht's home and finds an elderly man in the attic but is knocked unconscious before being able to establish his identity. When he regains consciousness, Joe sees the old man being driven away. It is now revealed by von Brecht and Lisa that his father didn’t manage to escape two years ago, but swapped places with another escapee when mortally wounded. Meanwhile, Brenner, really a Russian agent, has kidnapped the old man and is taking him back to Russia by train. Joe then tracks them to a railway station and boards the train.  Following a battle with Brenner, who falls from the moving train, Joe rescues the scientist from being abducted to the East and helps him escape from the country.

Cast
 Stanley Baker as Joe Newman 
 Peter Cushing as Doctor Peter von Brecht 
 Mai Zetterling as Lisa von Deutsch 
 Eric Portman as Inspector Hofmeister 
 Nigel Green as Sergeant Hirsch
 Georgina Ward as Maria 
 Niall MacGinnis as Brenner 
 Barbara Everest as Martha 
 Harold Scott as Professor 
 Alfred Burke as Heinrich 
 James Ottaway as Rahn 
 Mela White as Helga 
 Maya Sorell as Minna

References

External links

1963 films
1960s thriller films
British thriller films
CinemaScope films
Films directed by Quentin Lawrence
Films set in West Germany
Films set in East Germany
Cold War films
Films based on television series
1960s English-language films
1960s British films